Wii Freeloader is a bootdisc developed by Datel to circumvent regional lockout on the Wii video game console. It allows the playing of games from other regions, but does not allow the use of DVD±R, commonly used for backups, copies or homebrew. It can be used in combination with a modchip to allow compatibility with more games or to use an update blocker. The user enters the bootdisc into the Wii system, launches the application from the Wii Menu, then replaces the disc with a region-locked game disc. This disc allows the user to play foreign GameCube games, but there have been some issues reported with different signals and the games simply not working on a foreign system, even with use of the Wii Freeloader.

On June 17, 2008, Nintendo released Wii Menu 3.3, which blocked Wii Freeloader.

Hidden language on games
Some Wii games have more than one version of the game on their disc. Siliconera has reported that the North American version of the video game Trauma Center: New Blood, when played on a Japanese Wii after using the Wii Freeloader, will switch over and play the Japanese version of the game on the system.

Games not compatible with Freeloader
 Naruto Shippuuden: Gekitou Ninja Taisen EX
 Ōkami US works on EU Wii through the Freeloader.
 Crayon Shin-Chan: Saikyou Kazoku Kasukabe King

References

External links
US Wii Freeloader Page
EU Wii Freeloader Page

Video game boot disks
Wii software
Unlicensed Nintendo hardware